Donald Craik (August 26, 1931 – September 2, 1985) was a politician in Manitoba, Canada.  He was a Progressive Conservative member of the Legislative Assembly of Manitoba from 1966 to 1981, and served as a cabinet minister in the governments of Walter Weir and Sterling Lyon.

Born in Baldur, Manitoba, Craik was educated at the University of Manitoba and the University of Minnesota, earning his Master of Science and Master of Education degrees.  He worked as a mechanical engineer and associate professor of engineering after his graduation.  He was the chairman of the St. Vital School Board from 1962 to 1964, and director the Manitoba Research Council from 1964 to 1966. Craik also worked as a consulting engineer in Winnipeg from 1966 until his death.  He married the former Shirley Hill and they had three children:  Judy (1958), Polly (1961), and Donna (1964). During the 1970s, Craik opened Fine Line Telephone Answering and Secretarial Services.

He was elected to the Manitoba legislature in the provincial election of 1966, scoring a relatively easy victory in the Winnipeg riding of St. Vital.  Despite his youth and relative inexperience, he was appointed to cabinet on November 7, 1967, as Minister of Mines and Natural Resources.  On September 24, 1968, he was named Minister of Youth and Education with responsibility for the Public Libraries Act and the Legislative Library Act.

As education minister, Craik passed legislation allowing aboriginal Canadians to vote (and be elected to) local school boards.  He credited a private member's bill from NDP MLA Sidney Green as the inspiration for this legislation.

His first tenure in cabinet proved short-lived, as the Tories lost the 1969 election to the New Democratic Party.  Craik himself defeated New Democratic challenger James Buchanan by only 29 votes in the redistributed riding of Riel.  In the 1973 election, he defeated cabinet minister Wilson Parasiuk by a slightly greater margin.

The Tories returned to power in the 1977 election, and Craik was re-elected over NDP candidate Doreen Dodick by almost 4,000 votes.  On October 24, 1977, he was appointed Minister of Finance, Chairman of the Manitoba Energy Council and minister responsible for Manitoba Hydro.  He held these positions until January 16, 1981, and also served as Chairman of the Treasury Board from October 20, 1978 to November 23, 1979 and Minister of Energy and Mines with responsibility for Manitoba Forestry Resources Limited.

On January 16, 1981, Craik was appointed deputy premier, with responsibility for the Manitoba Energy Council and the Manitoba Development Corporation.

The Tories lost power to the NDP in the 1981 provincial election, and Craik personally lost to Doreen Dodick by 242 votes in a rematch from 1977.

He died at his cottage at Clearwater Bay, Ontario in 1985, at the relatively young age of 54.  He had previously suffered a heart attack in the 1970s.

There is currently a Donald Craik Engineering Library at the University of Manitoba. The same institution offers a Don Craik Memorial Scholarship.

References 

Progressive Conservative Party of Manitoba MLAs
1931 births
1985 deaths
University of Minnesota College of Science and Engineering alumni
Members of the Executive Council of Manitoba
Finance ministers of Manitoba
University of Manitoba alumni